Autumn is one of the four temperate seasons.

Autumn may also refer to:

Film
 Autumn (1930 film), an animated Disney Silly Symphony short
 Autumn (1990 film), an Estonian-Russian film starring Kaljo Kiisk
 Autumn (2008 film) or Sonbahar, a film by Özcan Alper
 Autumn (2009 film), a zombie film based on the book by David Moody
 Autumn (2010 film) or Harud

Literature
 Autumn (Knausgård book), a 2017 book of essays by Karl Ove Knausgård
 Autumn (Smith novel), a 2016 novel by Ali Smith
 Autumn (play), a 1937 British play by Margaret Kennedy and Gregory Ratoff
 Autumn, a 1916 poem by Bliss Carman
 Autumn, a 2001 zombie novel by David Moody

Music

Groups
 Autumn (Dutch band), a Dutch gothic metal group
 Autumn (Australian band)
 The Autumns, an American indie rock band

Musicians
 Autumn (rapper), an American rapper

Classical music
 Autumn (concerto), a concerto from Vivaldi's The Four Seasons
 In Autumn (Grieg), a concert overture

Albums
 The Autumns (album), a 2004 album by The Autumns
 Autumn (Don Ellis album) (1968)
 Autumn (Subtle EP) (2002)
 Autumn (George Winston album) (1980)

Songs
 "Autumn" (song), a 1974 song by Strawbs
 "Autumn", a 1972 song by the Edgar Winter Group from They Only Come Out at Night
 "Autumn", a 1982 song by Level 42 from Strategy
 "Autumn", a 2010 song by Joanna Newsom from Have One on Me

Labels
 Autumn Records, a 1960s pop label based in California

Other uses
 Autumn (given name), a feminine given name

People with the surname
 Emilie Autumn (born 1979), American singer and violinist

See also
 The Autumn of the Patriarch, a 1975 novel by Gabriel García Márquez
 Autumnal equinox (disambiguation)
 Jennifer Blake (wrestler) (born 1983), also known by her ring-name Autumn Frost
 Fall (disambiguation)
 Forever Autumn (disambiguation)
 "To Autumn", an 1819 poem by John Keats